Paul Bennet (born 16 November 1973 in Taree, Australia) is an Australian aerobatic pilot. He has placed first in the Australian Aerobatic Championships in both the Advanced and Unlimited category.

Outside of competition aerobatics he is also a well known international airshow performer flying a wide range of aircraft.

Biography
Bennet grew up in Old Bar, near Taree NSW, Australia. He is the only son to Janet and Robert. He went to school at Old Bar Primary School and Taree High School. After completing school, Paul was offered an apprenticeship as a shipwright at Seafari Shipwrights in Forster, New South Wales.
He worked as the manager of Genkem fiberglass supplies. Genkem later changed its name to Trojan Fibreglass and Composite Supplies, which he now manages.
In 2005 he began Paul Bennet Airshows, a company offering air show management and air displays.

Bennet's Aircraft
Bennet's aeroplane, the Wolf Pitts Pro biplane, was originally built by Steve Wolf of Wolf Aircraft for Wyche T. Colman III and its engine is claimed to produce more than 400 horsepower. The Wolf Pitts Pro weighs 1200 pounds and is equipped with a unique set of wings that give the aircraft a roll rate of 350 degrees per second. The tail on the aeroplane is modeled after the tail used on high-performance radio control aircraft.

In addition to the Wolf Pitts Pro, Paul owns and displays the other following aircraft:-

Wolf Pitts S1-11X
S1 Pitts Specials
Grumman Avenger
T28 Trojan
CAC Wirraway
Stinson L5
Yak 52
Cessna O2
Pitts Model 12
Rebel 300
Lancair 320

References

Living people
1973 births
Aerobatic pilots
People from New South Wales